The Minnesota–North Dakota ice hockey rivalry is an intercollegiate ice hockey rivalry between the Minnesota Golden Gophers and North Dakota Fighting Hawks. The rivalry is between two of the most successful programs in the sport, as the teams have combined for 13 national titles and 43 Frozen Four appearances in the NCAA tournament. Minnesota has met North Dakota five times in the national tournament, holding a narrow 3–2 advantage. The teams have played 292 official games through the 2019-20 season, with Minnesota leading 142–134–16.

After the 2012–13 season, Minnesota moved to the newly-created Big Ten Conference, which began to sponsor ice hockey for the first time. Conference affiliation compelled the Gophers to leave the historic Western Collegiate Hockey Association, which the Gophers and Fighting Sioux had competed in together for 47 years. As a consequence of the move, the two would not play each other for two consecutive regular seasons, ending a run of 66 consecutive years of regular-season meetings, through they would meet in the 2014 Frozen Four. After the two year hiatus, the programs have scheduled non-conference matchups to preserve the rivalry, though the series no longer consists of the four game slate that constituted the old conference schedule. Nonetheless, the two programs continue to consider each other to be their most-heated foe. The non-conference meetings are scheduled to continue through the 2022-23 season.

Series history 
The series dates back to 1948, though Minnesota counts 1930s games against North Dakota before it became a varsity program in the official standings. Early folklore concerns partisans of the Fighting Sioux throwing dead Gophers onto the ice.

Minnesota topped the Fighting Sioux in overtime in the national championship of the 1979 NCAA tournament, the first national postseason meeting between the two programs. In Detroit, the Gophers would down the Sioux in coach Herb Brooks's last game for Minnesota. Eight Gophers played the following year for Brooks as part of the Miracle on Ice team representing the United States in the 1980 Winter Olympics.

In 2005, the programs would meet in the Frozen Four for the second time. North Dakota raced to a 4–0 lead and held on despite two late goals from the Gophers. The win propelled North Dakota to the national championship, in which they lost to the Denver Pioneers.

After the Gophers had left the WCHA and catalyzed widespread conference realignment, the teams missed facing each other in the 2013–14 season. However, they met in the postseason, in the 2014 Frozen Four. Tied at 1 goal apiece, Justin Holl scored with 0.6 seconds left in the final period to secure a miracle win for the Gophers, as they advanced to the NCAA title game.

Rival accomplishments 
The following summarizes the accomplishments of the two programs.

Game results

References

College ice hockey rivalries in the United States
Minnesota Golden Gophers men's ice hockey
North Dakota Fighting Hawks men's ice hockey